Flemington is an inner-city suburb in Melbourne, Victoria, Australia,  north-west of Melbourne's Central Business District, located within the Cities of Melbourne and Moonee Valley local government areas. Flemington recorded a population of 7,025 at the 2021 census.

Flemington is located between the Maribyrnong River and the Moonee Ponds Creek and includes the locality of Newmarket, in which the main commercial area Racecourse Road is located.

The suburb was named by settler James Watson after Flemington Estate in Scotland. Another version of the origin of the name relates to Robert Fleming, a Brunswick resident who had owned land beside the Saltwater River and operated a butchery there.

The Melbourne Cup Thoroughbred horse race has been held at Flemington Racecourse since 1861.

History

In 1839, James Watson came to Port Phillip to purchase land for himself and English and Scottish investors. He named the area Flemington after Flemington Estate in Scotland where his wife's father was a manager, which was in turn named because of Flemish settlement in the area.

Flemington and neighbouring Kensington consist primarily of weatherboard cottages mixed with attached brick single-storey and some double-storey terrace houses. Most of the homes are in Victorian or Boom style with some Edwardian and Federation style homes. Some sections originally contained factories and industry.

The earliest land release was in the 1840s when fertile land adjacent to the Maribyrnong River was taken up for cattle grazing. Land for Flemington Racecourse was reserved as early as 1845. Around this time the Melbourne Municipal Saleyards were relocated from Elizabeth Street, West Melbourne to Flemington. Also around this time abattoirs and other commercial activities were established. Various industrial activities were clustered around the Maribyrnong River and the Moonee Ponds Creek.

The Victorian Goldrush of the 1850s encouraged further development as Mount Alexander Road was the main route to the North Western Goldfields. Flemington Post Office opened on 1 January 1854; the current heritage-listed building dates from 1890.

It was originally included in the City of Essendon at its formation in 1861 and the first Melbourne Cup was run at Flemington the same year. Buntingford Tannery (now demolished) was located adjacent to Moonee Ponds Creek. This business, established by members of the Debney family, moved to the site in 1876 and at one time covered more than an acre of ground and consisted of several buildings.

Flemington and Kensington broke away from the City of Essendon in 1882 to form the Borough of Flemington and Kensington as the decade saw intensified residential development consisting of detached single-storey weatherboard homes and some brick semi-detached or attached single-storey homes on small allotments. Some larger homes including grandiose double-storey brick homes on double allotments, and some double-storey brick terrace homes were also constructed. Industry consisting of mills, factories and warehouses continued in the area taking advantage of the low-cost flat land. By 1911 the population was 6,109.

In 1905 the Borough of Flemington and Kensington was subsumed by the City of Melbourne.

During the 1950s there was an influx of European immigrants, mostly from Italy.

Flemington Magistrates' Court closed on 30 June 1982.

Flemington Racecourse and Racecourse Road

Flemington Racecourse is famous for the Melbourne Cup horse race, run on the first Tuesday in November since 1861, by the Victoria Racing Club.

Racecourse Road is the suburb's main commercial area. Pin Oak Crescent has a small number of shops and cafes. Newmarket station is on Pin Oak Crescent, near its intersection with Racecourse Road.

In the late 1990s, a new shopping plaza was constructed on an old car sale yard on Racecourse Road, directly west of Newmarket Station. Several new apartment buildings were built on empty allotments behind the Racecourse Road and Pin Oak Crescent shops.

Barry Humphries declared in 2005 that his favourite building in Melbourne was the Flemington Post Office, which is on Wellington Street.

Facilities

Education
Flemington has three kindergartens, three primary schools, a secondary college and a special needs school.

Parks and open space
The suburb has twelve parks, reserves and ovals.

Demographics

In the 2016 census, there were 7,719 people in Flemington. 52.7% of people were born in Australia. The next most common countries of birth were Vietnam 5.2%, Ethiopia 3.3%, Somalia 2.2%, New Zealand 1.9% and China 1.8%. 50.6% of people spoke only English at home. Other languages spoken at home included Vietnamese 5.5%, Somali 4.9%, Arabic 3.9%, Cantonese 3.5% and Mandarin 1.9%. The most common responses for religion were No Religion 33.9% and Catholic 18.0%.

Housing

Flemington has a mix of housing styles including detached single family homes, terrace houses and semi-detached homes, many dating to the Victorian and Edwardian eras. The area around Wellington Street and Farnham Street includes many walk-up privately owned flats built during the 1960s and 1970s.

Flemington also contains a large public housing estate consisting of four twenty storey towers and several three and four-storey walk-up blocks of flats. The estate was constructed in the 1960s on flat land adjacent to the Moonee Ponds Creek on a site previously occupied by factories. Small tracts of Housing Commission houses are dotted through other parts of Flemington.

Transport

Road

The main arterial road is Racecourse Road, which is part of the Princes Highway. The CityLink tollway also runs along the suburb's boundary to the east.

Train

The suburb is served by two railway stations, Newmarket on the Craigieburn line, and Flemington Bridge on the Upfield line.

The Flemington Racecourse line operates only during events at Flemington Racecourse or the Melbourne Showgrounds. It has two stations, Flemington Racecourse and Showgrounds, and branches off the Craigieburn line just north of Newmarket station. However, the line does not serve Newmarket station, instead running direct to North Melbourne, Southern Cross and Flinders Street.

Tram
Tram Route 57 travels from West Maribyrnong to City (Flinders Street / Elizabeth Street)
Tram Route 59 travels from Airport West to City (Flinders Street / Elizabeth Street)

Bus
404: Footscray – Moonee Ponds Junction via Flemington, Ascot Vale, Newmarket (Monday to Saturday), operated by Transit Systems
472: Moonee Ponds Junction – Williamstown via Ascot Vale, Flemington Racecourse, Footscray, North Williamstown station (every day), operated by Transit Systems
942: City – St Albans (route extension to Sunbury) via Footscray, Sunshine, Deer Park (Saturday and Sunday mornings), NightRider service operated by Dysons

See also
 City of Essendon – Parts of Flemington were previously within this former local government area.

References

 
Suburbs of Melbourne
Suburbs of the City of Melbourne (LGA)
Suburbs of the City of Moonee Valley